Katamanso War also known (Battle of Dodowa) was a war that several tribes united with the British, fought and prevented Ashantis from dominating the coast in 1824. Numerous tribes in the Gold Coast such as the Fantes, Ga, Akyems, Adas were led by the British army to fight the Ashantis. It is classified as one of the "Anglo-Ashanti Wars" according to historical evidence at the National Archives.

History 
The Ashanti King or Asantehene (Osei Yaw Akoto) at that time, furious at the Ga-Adangbe for aiding the Fantes in the Asamankow War of 1824, proposed to punish them. He decided to pursue them, even if they escape into the belly of kanfra (a small flat fish).

On 7 August 1826, the war began also known as the "Battle of Dodowa". However he met a coalition of other indigenous forces allied with the Ga-Adangbe of Prampram, Ningo and Ada people under their Monarch King Tackie Kome. British, Dutch and Danish forces all together not more than 60, aided in the war with new weapons after an attack on cape coast in July 1824. The Asantehene amassed an army of 40,000. An alliance of British with Ga-Adangbe, Fanti, Denkyira, Akwamu and Akyems at Katamanso near Dodowa faced the Asante army. The Akyems were led by the Okyehene, Nana Afia Dokuaa, the only woman ruler of a major state. But the allied forces fought gallantly and overcame the Ashanti Army with a devastating victory which paralysed the Ashanti Empire and was a factor in the loss of its former glory. This contributed to the British power and prestige rise on the coast. The Ashantis held their position for nine hours (6 AM to 3 PM).

Effects of the war 
The effects of the war included:
 Smooth trading activities with less fear of invasion.
 Unity of Ga-Adangbe.
 Accra became famous and their influence spread.
 Foreign countries and strangers traded with the coast for commercial purpose.

Historical facts 
The King was made to swear an oath as the 'ka ntam' (Akan for swear), 'na su (Akan for cry) = Corrupted into Katamanso.

The hair style worn by the Asante women called Gyese Nkran', (except Akra), vulgarized as Densinkran, was introduced to mourn the Asante dead in the Katamanso war.

References 

History of Ghana